Margaret Scott or Maggie Scott may refer to:
Margaret Scott (Salem witch trials) (c. 1615–1692), convicted at the Salem witch trials and hanged
Margaret Scott (golfer) (1874–1938), British golfer
Margaret Scott (suffragette) or Margot Schenke (1888–1973), UK suffragette
Margaret Scott (dancer) (1922–2019), South African-born Australian dancer
Margaret Scott (New Zealand author) (1928–2014), New Zealand writer, editor and librarian
Marilyn Waltz or Margaret Scott (1931–2006), American actress and model
Margaret Scott (Australian author) (1934–2005), Australian author, poet and television personality
Maggie Scott, Lady Scott (born 1960), member of the Scottish Faculty of Advocates and Queen's Counsel
Maggie Scott (1955), British actor, feminist, textile artist and wife of actor Paul Freeman
USS Margaret Scott, a U.S. Navy Stone Fleet ship

Scott, Margaret